In anatomy, isthmus refers to a constriction between organs. This is a list of anatomical isthmi:

 Aortic isthmus, section of the aortic arch
 Cavo-tricuspid isthmus of the right atrium of the heart, a body of fibrous tissue in the lower atrium between the inferior vena cava, and the tricuspid valve
 Isthmus, the ear side of the eustachian tube
 Isthmus, narrowed part between the trunk and the splenium of the corpus callosum
 Isthmus, formation of the shell membrane in birds oviduct's
 Isthmus lobe, lobe in the prostate
 Isthmus of cingulate gyrus
 Isthmus of fauces, opening at the back of the mouth into the throat
 Isthmus organizer, secondary organizer region at the junction of the midbrain and metencephalon
 Isthmus tubae uterinae, links the fallopian tube to the uterus
 Kronig isthmus, band of resonance representing the apex of lung
 Thyroid isthmus, thin band of tissue connecting some of the lobes that make up the thyroid
 Uterine isthmus, inferior-posterior part of uterus

Isthmus
Anatomical isthmus